Abrar-e Varzeshi (lit. "Samaritans Sports") is a daily newspaper published in Iran.

Profile
Abrar-e Varzeshi is a sports daily. Its sister newspapers are Abrar and Abrar-e Eghtesdai.

See also
List of newspapers in Iran

References

Newspapers published in Iran
Persian-language newspapers
Sports mass media in Iran
Sports newspapers